Woodbridge station is a train station in Woodbridge, Virginia. It serves Amtrak's Northeast Regional line and Virginia Railway Express's Fredericksburg Line. Woodbridge's Rippon station is also served by VRE. Woodbridge station is located at 1040 Express Way, on the opposite side of the tracks of the Jefferson Davis Highway (U.S. 1).

History
The Woodbridge station was originally built in 1992. It is located near the site of a former Richmond, Fredericksburg and Potomac Railroad station known as "Occoquan Station," until 1951 when it was renamed "Woodbridge Station." The Carolinian stopped here between 1995 and 1999.

A second platform on the western side of the tracks was completed prior to the planned Summer 2010 initiation of express service to Washington. Access from northbound US 1 to the platform and elevator on the western side was included in the project.

A planned $29.7 million project will add a third track, convert one side platform to an island platform, and lengthen both platforms. Construction is expected to be complete around 2027.

Notes

External links
 

VRE – Woodbridge Train Station
Woodbridge Amtrak-VRE Station (USA Rail Guide – Train Web)

Transportation buildings and structures in Prince William County, Virginia
Amtrak stations in Virginia
Virginia Railway Express stations
Railway stations in the United States opened in 1992
1992 establishments in Virginia
Woodbridge, Virginia